Kim Je-nam (born 12 June 1963) is a South Korean politician   who served as President Moon Jae-in's Senior Presidential Secretary for Civil Society from 2020 to 2021. Kim was the first woman to ever assume such a post.

Before she was promoted to senior presidential secretary, Kim worked for Moon as his secretary for climate and the environment despite her previous political career as an opposition party parliamentarian and member. In May 2021 Kim was replaced by Bang Jung-kyun, a professor at Sangji University.

Before entering politics, Kim worked for civil societies for environment - most notably Green Korea United. Kim was one of central figures in merging three environmental organisations into Green Korea United in 1994. Kim led this organisation as its first Deputy Secretary General from its foundation to 2007.

In 2012 election Kim was placed as the number 5 on Unified Progressive Party's proportional representation list. In less than a half year later, Kim joined other well known progressive figures of her party such as Sim Sang-jung and Roh Hoe-chan in leaving their party and founding a new party, now-Justice Party. She joined her new party's leadership as its floor spokesperson from 2013 to 2015 and senior deputy floor leader from 2015 to 2016. In 2016 election, Kim withdrew her nomination and endorsed Kang Byungwon from Democratic Party after their agreed poll found Kang more likely to defeat Lee Jae-oh, a senior conservative parliamentarian.

Kim holds a bachelor's degree in history from Duksung Women's University.

Electoral history

References 

1963 births
Living people
Duksung Women's University alumni
People from Naju
Justice Party (South Korea) politicians
South Korean government officials
21st-century South Korean women politicians
21st-century South Korean politicians